Templepatrick is a civil parish in County Westmeath, Ireland.

Templepatrick is one of 9 civil parishes in the barony of Rathconrath in the Province of Leinster.

Piercetown civil parish comprises the small village of Moyvore and 5 townlands: Beltacken, Moyvore, Rahadorrish, Templepatrick and Tonlemony.

The neighbouring civil parishes are: Piercetown to the north, Ballymorin to the south–east, Killare to the south–west and Forgney (County Longford) to the west.

References

External links
Templepatrick civil parish at the IreAtlas Townland Data Base
Templepatrick civil parish at townlands.ie
Templepatrick civil parish at The Placenames Database of Ireland

Civil parishes of County Westmeath